The 2021 Porsche Mobil 1 Supercup was the 29th Porsche Supercup season. It began on 23 May at Circuit de Monaco and ended on 12 September at the Autodromo Nazionale di Monza, after eight races, all of which were support events for the 2021 Formula One season.

Rule changes

Technical
The outgoing Porsche 911 GT3 Cup (Type 991 II) car fleet was replaced by the latest generation of Porsche 911 GT3 Cup (Type 992) and also all-new Porsche MA2.75 engines for all Porsche Supercup entrants from 2021 season onwards.
ExxonMobil increased its Porsche Supercup partnership by becoming the official fuel retailer and convenience store partner and supplier of the series starting from 2021 season through Esso brand. All Porsche Supercup cars utilized Esso Synergy™ Renewable Racing Fuel with full-blend of Ethanol.

Teams and drivers

Race calendar and results
The 2021 Porsche Mobil 1 Supercup provisional calendar was released on 28 November 2020. On 14 May 2021, due to the changes in the Formula One calendar, the Porsche Supercup calendar was also adjusted, with the round at Paul Ricard on 25–27 June being replaced by a second round at the Red Bull Ring. Later on 28 June 2021 it was announced that the round at Silverstone would be cancelled and an additional race would be held at Monza.

Championship standings

Scoring system
Points were awarded to the top fifteen classified drivers in every race, using the following system:

In order for full points to be awarded, the race winner must complete at least 50% of the scheduled race distance. Half points are awarded if the race winner completes less than 50% of the race distance. In the event of a tie at the conclusion of the championship, a count-back system is used as a tie-breaker, with a driver's/constructor's best result used to decide the standings.

Guest drivers are ineligible to score points. If a guest driver finishes in first position, the second placed finisher will receive 25 points. The same goes for every other points scoring position. So if three guest drivers end up placed fourth, fifth and sixth, the seventh placed finisher will receive fourteen points and so forth - until the eighteenth placed finisher receives the final point.

Drivers' Championship
Source:

Notes
† – Driver did not finish the race, but were classified as they completed over 75% of the race distance.

Rookie Championship

Pro-Am Championship

Teams' Championship

References

External links
 

Porsche Supercup seasons
Porsche Supercup